Ibbetson is a surname. Notable people with the surname include:

Agnes Ibbetson (1757–1823), vegetable physiologist
Arthur Ibbetson (1922–1997), British cinematographer
David Ibbetson, a British legal scholar
Denzil Ibbetson, KCSI (1847–1908), administrator in British India and an author
Henry Selwin-Ibbetson, 1st Baron Rookwood (1826–1902), 7th Baronet 1869–1892, and British Conservative politician
Julius Caesar Ibbetson (1759–1817), British 18th-century landscape and watercolour painter
Levett Landon Boscawen Ibbetson (1799–1869), 19th century geologist, inventor, organiser and soldier
Peter Ibbetson, American black-and-white drama film released in 1935
Peter Ibbetson (opera), opera in three acts by American composer Deems Taylor
Robert Ibbetson, colonial governor of the Straits Settlements of Penang, Malacca, and Singapore from 1832 to 1834

See also
Peter Ibbetson (novel), 1891 novel by George du Maurier, late adapted to stage and screen